James "Micah" Van Huss is an American politician and was a Republican member of the Tennessee House of Representatives representing House District 6 elected January 8, 2013. Van Huss reported within his 2016 Tennessee Ethics Commission ss-8004 Statement of Disclosure of Interests that he receives compensation as an employee from the Watauga Recovery Centers, Inc. suboxone clinic of Johnson City, Tennessee. In 2021, the conservative publicly policy organization Americans for Prosperity announced that Van Huss would lead their grassroots activities in upper East Tennessee. In 2022 Van Huss published his first book through Southwest Radio Ministries.

Education
Van Huss completed his BS with a major in Computer Science and a minor in E-Business and Graphic Design from Pensacola Christian College during 2003.

After graduating from Pensacola Christian College, Van Huss started up his online Christian video gaming site, LordPickle.com, and related web sites with different domain names, such as MicorShop.com (circa 2004–2006), LeviathanStrategies.com (circa 2006–2008), and TheLordClan.net (circa 2006–2011; 2013–2016) and DynastyTees.com

Legislative career
In 2012 Van Huss challenged District 6 incumbent Representative Dale Ford in the August 2, 2012 Republican Primary, winning with 3,154 votes (53.9%), and won the November 6, 2012 General election with 16,391 votes (72.3%) against Democratic nominee Michael Clark.

In 2018, Van Huss was widely ridiculed for quoting the well-known satirical website The Onion in connection with a bill on hazing. In January 2020, he introduced a bill that would recognize CNN and the Washington Post as fake news.

The American Conservative Union gave him a 100% rating in 2013 and a 91% evaluation in 2017.

On June 19, 2020, during the COVID-19 pandemic, the Tennessee House of Representatives passed House Resolution 340, introduced by Van Huss, resolving that the "mainstream media has sensationalized the reporting on COVID-19 in the service of political agendas."

Van Huss registered his Leviathan Designs, LLC business with the Tennessee Secretary of State on November 30, 2016.

References

External links
Official page at the Tennessee General Assembly
Campaign site

James Van Huss at Ballotpedia
James (Micah) Van Huss at the National Institute on Money in State Politics

Place of birth missing (living people)
Living people
Republican Party members of the Tennessee House of Representatives
Military personnel from Tennessee
Pensacola Christian College alumni
People from Washington County, Tennessee
United States Marines
21st-century American politicians
1978 births